Stephen Charles "Steve" Finnane (born 3 July 1952) was a rugby union player who represented Australia.

Finnane, a prop, was born in Sydney and claimed a total of six international rugby caps for Australia. He was dubbed the phantom puncher, for a short right uppercut delivered to Welsh player Graham Price in a scrum during the second Test match between the Wallabies and Wales at the SCG on 17 June 1978. The Welshman suffered a shattered jaw.  The Wallaby later wrote in a book that he hit Price.

The Wales match proved to be Finnane's last for Australia: although he was selected for the 1979 tour of New Zealand, he declined, choosing to focus on his professional career as a barrister. Finnane was admitted as a Barrister in the Supreme court on 6 June 1975. He is the brother of District Court judge Michael Finnane KC

References
SMH 22 August 2010

Australian rugby union players
Australia international rugby union players
1952 births
Living people
Rugby union players from Sydney
Rugby union props